This is a list of active joint United States congressional committees.

Committee leadership 
For purpose of seniority on joint committees, total time in Congress—Senate and House—is counted. Most joint committees rotate their chair and vice chair position between each chamber's majority at the end of a congressional term (two years), except for Taxation, which starts each term led by the House and rotates to the Senate at the end of each term's session (one calendar year).

Standing committees

Non-standing committees

Party leadership 
Each party determines their committees leads, who serve as chair in the majority and ranking member in the minority. The joint committees alternate between the chambers, with the majority lead in one serving as chair and the other as vice chair (and their respective minority opposites in the other chamber as ranking member and vice ranking member). The table below lists the tenure of when each member was selected for their current term as committee lead. The Republican party rules stipulate that their leads of standing committees may serve no more than three congressional terms (two years each) as chair or ranking member, unless the full party conference grants them a waiver to do so. This applies to the joint committees on Printing and on the Library (whose leads are from the Senate Rules and Administration and House Administration committees) and on Taxation (whose leads are from the Senate Finance and House Ways and Means committees). The current majority party of their respective chamber is listed first for each committee.

Senate leads

House leads

See also 
 United States Joint Congressional Committee on Inaugural Ceremonies
 List of United States Senate committees
 List of United States House of Representatives committees
 List of defunct United States congressional committees

Sources and external links
 

 
United States congressional joint committees